c Puppis, also known as HD 63032 and HR 3017, is a spectroscopic binary star in the constellation Puppis. Its apparent magnitude is 3.61. Located around  distant, the primary is an orange-red bright giant or supergiant of spectral type K2.5Ib-IIa or K5IIa, while the secondary, discovered in 1983, is a blue main-sequence star of spectral type B9V. The system is the brightest member of the open cluster NGC 2451, over two magnitudes brighter than every other star in the cluster. As the turnoff point of the cluster is currently around B7, the parameters of the system fit with cluster membership.

References

Puppis
K-type supergiants
K-type giants
Spectroscopic binaries
063032
Puppis, c
3017
037819
Durchmusterung objects